Inverlael is a hamlet on the southern tip of Loch Broom in Ross-shire in the Highland council area in Scotland. It is located on the A835 main road 6 miles from Ullapool and 50 miles from Inverness. It is also atop the River Lael from where it gets its name.

There are also many walking and hiking routes in the area surrounding the hamlet.

Etymology 
The name comes from Scottish Gaelic. Inver is the English translation of Inbhir which means the mouth of the river and Lael comes from the River Lael from which the hamlet is situated.

History

Historical records date Inverlael to at least the 13th Century. until the establishment of Ullapool in 1788 Inverlael was described as ‘the largest settlement north of Dingwall‘.

References 

Populated places in Ross and Cromarty